The following is a partial list of Czech musical artists, not including classical musicians.

A
 Luboš Andršt

B
 Monika Bagárová
 Dan Bárta
 Martina Bárta
 Václav Noid Bárta
 Bára Basiková
 Big Boss
 Lucie Bílá
 Věra Bílá
 Iva Bittová
 Pavel Bobek
 Vratislav Brabenec
 Aleš Brichta

C
 Boris Carloff
 František Ringo Čech
 Albert Černý
 Martin Chodúr
 Benny Cristo

D
 Michal David
 Debbi
 DJ Wich
 Jindra Dolanský
 Miloš "Dodo" Doležal
 Zbyněk Drda
 Karel Duba
 Lenka Dusilová

F
 Ewa Farna
 Iva Frühlingová

G
 Karel Gott
 Gabriela Gunčíková

H
 Lou Fanánek Hagen
 Jan Hammer
 Petr Hapka
 Jan Sahara Hedl
 Hana Hegerová
 Ondřej Hejma
 Radim Hladík
 Beata Hlavenková
 Milan Hlavsa
 Hana Horká
 Petr Hošek
 Jan Hrubý
 Barbora Hrzánová
 Daniel Hůlka
 Jaroslav Hutka

I
 Markéta Irglová

J
 Dalibor Janda
 Marta Jandová
 Petra Janů
 Josef Janíček
 Jaroslav Ježek
 Mikolas Josef

K
 Jiří Kabeš
 Tomas Kalnoky
 Joe Karafiát
 Svatopluk Karásek
 MC Kato
 Tereza Kerndlová
 Klara
 Tomáš Klus
 Michael Kocáb
 Vladimír Kokolia
 Petr Kolář
 David Koller
 Jiří Korn
 Ivan Král
 Martin Kratochvíl
 Anna K
 Karel Kryl
 Ladislav Křížek
 Marta Kubišová
 Vladimír Kulhánek

L
 Daniel Landa
 Aneta Langerová
 Janek Ledecký
 Lenny

M
 Leoš Mareš
 David Matásek
 Waldemar Matuška
 Vladimír Merta
 Vladimír Mišík
 Ivan Mládek
 Petr Muk

N
 Zuzana Navarová
 Robert Nebřenský
 Václav Neckář
 Jaroslav Jeroným Neduha
 Jiří Neduha
 Jaromír Nohavica
 Petr Novák

P
 Vladimír Padrůněk
 Michal Pavlíček
 Ivo Pešák
 Ota Petřina
 Eva Pilarová
 Petr Placák
 Josef Antonín Plánický
 Karel Plíhal
 Barbora Poláková
 Luboš Pospíšil

R
 Radůza
 Vlasta Redl
 Zdeněk Rytíř
 Řezník

S
 Jiří Schelinger
 Richard Scheufler
 Jiří Schmitzer
 Jaroslav Erno Šedivý
 Pavel Sedláček
 Ivan Sekyra
 Petr Skoumal
 Milan Smrčka
 Viktor Sodoma
 Ondřej Soukup
 Petr Spálený
 Jiří Stivín
 Kamil Střihavka
 Jarda Svoboda

T
 Vlastimil Třešňák
 Michal Tučný
 Eva Turnová

U
 Jaroslav Uhlíř
 Petr Ulrych

V
 Petr Váša
 Karel Velebný
 Emil Viklický
 Pavel Vítek
 Josef Vojtek
 Dáša Vokatá
 Helena Vondráčková
 Lucie Vondráčková
 Jan Vyčítal

W
 Miroslav Wanek
 Kateřina Winterová

Z
 Hana Zagorová
 Pavel Zajíček
 Karel Zich

See also
 List of Czech musical groups

Czech music
Czech